The commandant was the chief commanding position within the SS service of a Nazi concentration camp.  He held the highest rank and was the most important member of the camp unit.  The commandant directed the camp headquarters and was responsible for all issues of the nazi concentration 
camp.  The regulations of his duties and responsibilities came from the Concentration Camps Inspectorate (CCI).

Of utmost importance was his duty to ensure the safety of the camp.  Therefore, all SS personnel were obliged to report to him any important incident about the camp.  The commandant had to constantly stay in the camp; his absence for more than 24 hours required the consent of the Concentration Camps Inspectorate.  In the event of an alarm caused by rebellion or escape, all personnel were subject to his command, and he had complete control of the issuance of orders and commands.

Another duty was to instruct subordinates about their tasks, camp security issues and the treatment of prisoners.  He also watched over the affairs of the employment of prisoners, determining, among other things, working hours.  The commandant was assigned an adjutant, or deputy commandant, who was responsible for the immediate, complete and accurate execution of the commandant's orders.  Other SS personnel were subordinate to the deputy commandant.  In the largest concentration camps, ranks of commandants ranged mostly from SS-Hauptsturmführer to SS-Obersturmbannführer.

The commandant had authority over all disciplinary matters affecting the SS personnel of the concentration camp.  The individual departments within the concentration camp were under their respective parts of the Concentration Camps Inspectorate, but there were exceptions.  The CCI directly supervised the Wachtruppe (guard unit), the adjutants and the Schutzhaftlagerführers.

Nazi concentration camp locations and commandants

See also
Concentration Camps Inspectorate

Notes

Bibliography
 Friedrich Karl Kaul, Joachim Noak (ed.): Angeklagter Nr. 6: Eine Auschwitzdokumentation. Akademie-Verlag, Berlin 1966.
 Martin Weinmann (ed.): Das nationalsozialistische Lagersystem (CCP). Zweitausendeins, Frankfurt am Main 1990.
 Wolfgang Sofsky: Die Ordnung des Terrors. Das Konzentrationslager. S. Fischer, Frankfurt am Main 1993 .
 Karin Orth: Die Konzentrationslager-SS. Deutscher Taschenbuch-Verlag, München 2004, .
 Karin Orth: Das System der nationalsozialistischen Konzentrationslager. Pendo-Verlag, Zürich 202, 
 Peter Neitzke (ed.): Konzentrationslager Dokument F 321 für den Internationalen Militärgerichtshof Nürnberg. Zweitausendeins, Frankfurt am Main 2005, p. 334
 Tom Segev: Die Soldaten des Bösen. Zur Geschichte der KZ-Kommandanten. Rowohlt, Reinbek bei Hamburg 1995, .
 Ernst Klee: Das Personenlexikon zum Dritten Reich: Wer war was vor und nach 1945. Fischer-Taschenbuch-Verlag, Frankfurt am Main 2005, .
 Eugen Kogon: Der SS-Staat. Das System der deutschen Konzentrationslager, Alber, München 1946, zuletzt: Heyne, München 1995, 

Commandant
Commandant